Sutton Lake is a lake in Lane County, Oregon, in the United States.

Sutton Lake was named for Orrin W. Sutton, a pioneer who settled there.

See also
List of lakes in Oregon

References

Lakes of Lane County, Oregon
Lakes of Oregon